Annisquam Harbor Light Station is a historic lighthouse on Wigwam Point in the Annisquam neighborhood of Gloucester, Massachusetts. It can be viewed from nearby Wingaersheek Beach, Gloucester.  It lies on the Annisquam River and is one of the four oldest lighthouses to surround the Gloucester peninsula as well as; Eastern Point Light, Ten Pound Island Light, and Thacher Island Light.

History 
The first light station, a  wooden tower, was established in 1801, after Congress gathered $2000 in April for the completion. The building fell into disrepair and, in 1851, was replaced by an octagonal wooden tower of the same height. The original lighthouse keeper's house was repaired and, with alterations, has remained to this day; its floor plan resembles those at Race Point Light and Straitsmouth Island Light. It is a two-story, gabled roofed, wood-framed building. In 1869, a covered walkway was built between the house and the tower.

In 1897, the current brick lighthouse was built on the same foundation as the previous two constructions. Some time after 1900, the covered walkway, added in 1867, to the keeper's house was replaced by an uncovered wooden footbridge.

In 1931, a foghorn was installed, but until 1949, it was used only from October 15 to May 15 to spare summer residents the noise., but was activated in the summer of 1949 only during day hours. The lighthouse's fourth-order Fresnel lens and foghorn was automated in 1974, and became occupied by the Coast Guard. The fog signal was first removed by the Coast Guard, but after complaints by fishermen and local boaters, it was re-activated and eventually automated as well. In August 2000 Matty Nally and his crew completed the replacement of 3,000 bricks in efforts of restoration.

The interior of the lighthouse is equipped with a circular cast-iron staircase that leads to the top.
The lighthouse was added to the National Register of Historic Places in 1987, and is one of the oldest lighthouses in Massachusetts.

The original wooden keeper's house from 1801 is still used as a housing for United States Coast Guard personnel who manage the site. In 2000, a major restoration of the tower was conducted by the Coast Guard. In 2008, the building made an appearance, supposedly as a lighthouse in Maine, in the film remake The Women (starring Meg Ryan).

See also

National Register of Historic Places listings in Gloucester, Massachusetts
National Register of Historic Places listings in Essex County, Massachusetts

References

Lighthouses completed in 1801
Lighthouses completed in 1897
Lighthouses on the National Register of Historic Places in Massachusetts
Buildings and structures in Gloucester, Massachusetts
Lighthouses in Essex County, Massachusetts
National Register of Historic Places in Essex County, Massachusetts